Everyone Deserves Music is the fourth studio release by Michael Franti & Spearhead.

Track listing
All songs written by Michael Franti, Dave Shul and Carl Young except where indicated.

 "What I Be" (4:45)
 "We Don't Stop" (Franti, Shul, Young, Wood Farguheson, Jr., Tim Parker) (4:36)
 "Everyone Deserves Music" (4:36)
 "Never Too Late" (4:50)
 "Bomb the World" (4:28)
 "Pray for Grace" (4:52)
 "Love, Why Did You Go Away" (4:29)
 "Yes I Will" (4:01)
 "Feelin' Free" (3:54)
 "Love Invincible" (3:50)
 "Bomb the World (Armageddon Version)" (Franti, Shul, Young, Farguheson) (4:44)
 "Crazy, Crazy, Crazy" (3:30)

Charts

Certifications

References

Michael Franti albums
2001 albums